Moderate Venstre, also known as the Moderate Liberals or Moderate Left, was a political party in Denmark.

History
The party emerged as the largest faction in the 1892 Folketing elections, winning 39 of the 102 seats. The 1895 elections saw it defeated by the Venstre Reform Party, finishing in second place with 27 seats. In 1898 the party was reduced to 23 seats, before falling to 16 seats in 1901, twelve seats in 1903 and nine seats in 1906.

After the party recovered to win eleven seats in 1909, it merged into Venstre before the 1910 elections.

References

Defunct political parties in Denmark
Political parties disestablished in 1910
1910 disestablishments in Denmark
Political parties with year of establishment missing